Radio Magic or Magic Radio is a Bosnian local commercial radio station, broadcasting from Milići, Bosnia and Herzegovina.

This radio station broadcasts a variety of programs such as folk and pop music, talk show and local news. The owner of the radio station is the company MAGIC-TRADE d.o.o. Milići.

Program is mainly produced in Serbian language at three FM frequencies and it is available in the Bosansko Podrinje area and in parts of neighboring Serbia.

Estimated number of listeners of Radio Magic is around 52.346.

Frequencies
 Bratunac/Divič   
 Bratunac/Magašići 
 Milići/Milića brdo

See also 
 List of radio stations in Bosnia and Herzegovina
 Radio Vlasenica
 Radio Višegrad
 Radio Goražde
 Radio Osvit

References

External links 
 www.magic.ba
  www.radiostanica.ba
 Communications Regulatory Agency of Bosnia and Herzegovina

Milići